A gymnast is an athlete in gymnastics.

Gymnast may also refer to:

"The Gymnast" (Seinfeld), a 1994 episode
The Gymnast (2006 film), directed by Ned Farr
 "Gymnast", a song by Gucci Mane from I'm Up, 2012